Silas Dylan Songani (born 28 June 1989) is a Zimbabwean footballer who plays as midfielder for Vestri.

Club career

Harare City
Songani started his career with hometown club Harare City.

SønderjyskE
In January 2014, Songani moved to Danish club SønderjyskE. He made his league debut for the club on 21 February 2014 in a 4-0 away win over FC Vestsjælland. In this match, he also scored his first league goal for the club. It was the fourth and final of the match, and came in the 75th minute. He was replaced by Henrik Hansen five minutes later. 

Songani left SønderjyskE at the end of the 2018/19 season.

Loans
In August 2016, Songani was sent out on loan to FC Sydvest 05.

In July 2017, Songani was loaned out again, this time to Norwegian club Elverum. His league debut for the club came on 30 July 2017 in a 4-3 home loss to Florø SK. He was replaced by Sivert Solli in the 78th minute. His first league goal for the club came on 17 September 2017 in a 2-2 away draw with Ranheim Fotball. His goal, scored in the 24th minute, opened the scoring on the day.

Songani was loaned out to FC Sydvest once again on 31 August 2018 until the end of the year. He returned to SønderjyskE, but was loaned out again to the same club. This was announced on 29 January 2019. On 15 August 2019, he signed a permanent contract with the club.

Return to Zimbabwe
In January 2020, Songani signed with Zimbabwean club FC Platinum.

References

External links
 

1989 births
Living people
Association football wingers
Zimbabwean footballers
Zimbabwe international footballers
Harare City F.C. players
SønderjyskE Fodbold players
FC Sydvest 05 players
Elverum Fotball players
Vestri (football club) players
Zimbabwe Premier Soccer League players
Danish Superliga players
Danish 2nd Division players
1. deild karla players
Zimbabwean expatriate footballers
Expatriate men's footballers in Denmark
Zimbabwean expatriate sportspeople in Denmark
Expatriate footballers in Norway
Zimbabwean expatriate sportspeople in Norway
Expatriate footballers in Iceland